OneSwarm is a file sharing software that uses the BitTorrent protocol to share files anonymously between users. One application of the software is the ability to access the Dark Web.

References

External links

BitTorrent clients